Sadiq Alakbar oglu Dadashov (1905 – 1946) was an architect and architecture historian of the Soviet Azerbaijan, Honored Art Worker of the Azerbaijan SSR (1940), laureate of the Stalin Prize of the 2nd Degree (1941).

Biography
S.A. Dadashov was born on April 15, 1905 in Baku. In 1929, he graduated from Azerbaijan State Oil Academy (afterwards he became its professor). He was the author of books about the architecture of Azerbaijan. He was a full member of the Academy of Sciences of the Azerbaijan SSR (1945). Sadiq Dadashov worked in close cooperation with Mikayil Useynov. He developed progressive traditions of Azerbaijani architecture creatively. He erected many residential and public buildings in Baku and in other cities of Azerbaijan.

Dadashov died in Moscow, on December 24, 1946.

Architectural projects
•Exhibit hall of Azerbaijan SSR in All-Russia Exhibition Centre, in Moscow (1939).

•Cinema named after Nizami (1934).

•Nizami Museum of Azerbaijani Literature.

•Building of the Central Committee of the Communist Party of the Azerbaijan SSR (1938–1939).

•Building of Baku Academy of Music.

•Building of the Ministry of Food Industry of Azerbaijan (1937–1939).

Awards and premiums

 Stalin Prize of the 2nd Degree (1941) – for architectural project of the exhibit hall of Azerbaijan SSR in All-Russia Exhibition Centre (1939)

 Honored Art Worker of the Azerbaijan SSR (1940)

 Order of Lenin

 Order of the Red Banner of Labour

Legacy
Research Institute of construction materials in Baku is named after Dadashov.

References

1905 births
1946 deaths
20th-century Azerbaijani architects
Azerbaijan State Oil and Industry University alumni
Architects from Baku
Stalin Prize winners
Recipients of the Order of Lenin
Recipients of the Order of the Red Banner of Labour
Soviet Azerbaijani people
Azerbaijani professors
Azerbaijani architects
Soviet architects
Burials at Alley of Honor
Honored Art Workers of the Azerbaijan SSR